Crack USA: County Under Siege is a 1989 American documentary film directed by Vince DiPersio and Bill Guttentag. It was nominated for an Academy Award for Best Documentary Feature. It was broadcast on HBO as part of America Undercover.

References

External links

1989 films
1989 documentary films
American documentary films
Films directed by Bill Guttentag
Documentary films about drugs
1980s English-language films
1980s American films